Henri Pensis (November 3, 1900 – June 1, 1958), was a Luxembourgish conductor, composer and violinist.

Pensis was born on in the Pfaffenthal quarter of Luxembourg City. In 1933, he founded and became the first conductor of the Luxembourg Philharmonic Orchestra. He moved to the United States in 1940, conducting the New Jersey Philharmonic Orchestra and the Sioux City Symphony Orchestra. He conducted at least three concerts in Carnegie Hall. During Pensis' tenure with the Luxembourg Orchestra the first violin chair was occupied by Ern(e)st Eichel, a Polish violinist who was born in Sambor (Galicia) and had studied in Vienna and Cologne. This violinist who also led occasionally the Luxembourg Orchestra tried after the war to make a career as a conductor. For that purpose Eichel chose the 'nom de plume' of Ernest Borsamsky. Under this pseudonym, created by inverting the syllables of his birth town and adding a Polish "sky" he made some highly collectable recordings for East German Radio in Berlin and Leipzig. He also conducted once the Berlin Philharmonic in 1949. In 1956 his name can be traced last when he conducted the Dresden Orchestra.

Works
Soir d'été (poème symphonique)
Fugue classique
Suite pour orchestre
Scène de danse pour orchestre
Nockes an Nackes (comédie musicale)
Hymne solennel
Fantaisie de Noël

Popular songs
Fir d'Fräiheet
Op der Juegd
D'Fréijoerslidd

Various works are extant only in manuscripts.

1900 births
1958 deaths
20th-century classical composers
20th-century conductors (music)
20th-century classical violinists
20th-century male musicians
Luxembourgian composers
Luxembourgian conductors (music)
Luxembourgian classical violinists
Male classical composers
Male conductors (music)
Male classical violinists